Mikhail Vasilyevich Melnik (Ukrainian: Mikhailo Vasilyovich Melnik; May 18, 1957, the village of Beevo-Komuna, Lipovodolinsky district, Sumy region) - Ukrainian theater director, theater actor, screenwriter, music editor, musician. Honored Artist of Ukraine (1994), People's Artist of Ukraine (2005), Laureate of the Taras Shevchenko National Prize of Ukraine (2007). Founder, artistic director, director and the only actor of the one-of-a-kind Theater of one actor "Scream" (Dnepr).

Biography 
Mikhail Melnik was born on May 18, 1957, in the village of Beevo-Kommuna, now Melnikovo, Lipovodolinsky district, Sumy region of Ukraine. After military service in the Soviet army, which took place in the Separate Guard of Honor Company in Moscow, Melnik arrived in Kyiv, where he worked at an aircraft factory as a turner. In 1982 he graduated from the Kiev National University of Theatre, Cinema and Television named after I.K. Karpenko-Kary, class of Professor Ninel Antonovna Bychenko, Honored Art Worker of Ukraine. According to the distribution, the young artist was sent to the Nikolaev Academic Ukrainian Theater of Drama and Musical Comedy, where he worked for three months. After that, on the advice of colleagues, he moved to Dnepropetrovsk. Anatoly Yakovlevich Litko, the chief director of the Taras Shevchenko Ukrainian Music and Drama Theater, accepted Melnik into the theater without an audition. On the small stage of the Taras Shevchenko Dnepropetrovsk Theatre, where Mikhail Melnyk has been working since 1989, he staged Haidamaks based on the poem by Taras Shevchenko, The Lost Ones based on the works of Ostap Vyshnya. Wanted to launch Michel de Gelderode's Escorial, but the play did not pass the artistic council.

He combined acting and directing work in the drama theater with the artistic direction of the theater studio at the Dnipropetrovsk Assembly College, whose performances eventually became very popular among the townspeople. In 1987, on the basis of the theater studio of the assembly technical school, Melnik created the Scream Theater Studio. With the performances of "Gaidamaki" and "The Lost" "Scream" performed not only in Ukraine, but also in other countries of the former USSR.

In 1989 Mikhail Melnik opened the theater-studio of the same name in the former Museum of Komsomol Glory named after Alexander Matrosov. It was she who became the forerunner of the unique theater of one actor. Due to a lack of funds, he was forced to independently equip the premises for the theater, make benches for spectators, backstage, lighting and sound equipment with his own hands. Academic Ukrainian theater of one actor "Scream" is the only case when the theater director is both an actor, a screenwriter and a music editor, an artist and a costume designer. Moreover, the actor does not work on a bare platform, but with the use of scenographic, musical, lighting elements of a modern theatrical performance. The performances of the theater have gained wide popularity, although the theater cannot be called mobile - despite its compactness, the Scream rarely goes on tour.

Mikhail Melnik received many prestigious theater awards for his performances. In the same 1989, Mikhail Melnik received the "Golden Lion", and his one-man show "Haydamaki" based on the poem by T. G. Shevchenko won at the "Theatrical Pridneprovye-89" festival. The following year, Melnik's acting work in the play "The Lost" based on the works of Ostap Vishnya was noted at the "Theatrical Pridneprovye-90". In 1991, for staging the play "Kara" based on the novel by Nikolai Gogol "Taras Bulba", Mikhail Melnik received the Second Prize of the "Theatrical Pridneprovya-91". In 1994, Mikhail Vasilyevich was the winner of the 1st prize of the theater festival for the highest theater award of the Dnieper region "Sicheslavna-1994" for the original interpretation of Vladimir Nabokov's novel "Lolita". In the same year, he was awarded the title of Honored Artist of Ukraine.

In 1996, the founder and artistic director of the first Ukrainian theater of one actor "Scream" Mikhail Vasilyevich Melnyk became the first laureate of the Les Kurbas Prize, as well as the laureate and owner of the Grand Prix of the theater competition "Sicheslavna-1996".

In 2004, for the play "Sin" based on the works of the classic of Ukrainian literature Mikhail Kotsyubinsky "Intermezzo" and "What is written in the book of life", Mikhail Vasilyevich received the award of the Highest Regional Theater Award "Sicheslavna" for the best director, and in 2007 for the production of " Sin" Melnyk was awarded the Taras Shevchenko National Prize of Ukraine - the highest creative award in Ukraine for a significant contribution to the development of culture and art.

In 2005, Mikhail Melnik received the Silver Knight award at the 3rd Golden Knight International Theater Festival. In the same year, by the Decree of the President of Ukraine, he was awarded the title of People's Artist of Ukraine.

Despite his own merits, popularity and theatrical universalism, Mikhail Melnik continues to study even now. At the age of fifty-one, the actor and director undertook to master the art of playing the saxophone. You can hear how Melnik plays at the lyrical performance-contact "The sun in your eyes ..."

A bright page in the creative activity of Mikhail Vasilyevich Melnik was the audio CD "Prophet" based on the works of Taras Shevchenko, in which the actor offers his own interpretation of the most famous poems of Kobzar.

Scenery 

 "Haidamaki" - based on the poem of the same name by Taras Shevchenko (1986-1993)
 "The Lost" - based on the works of Ostap Vishnya (1989-1991)
 "Kara" - based on the novel by Nikolai Gogol "Taras Bulba" (1991-1997)
 "Lolita" - based on the novel of the same name by Vladimir Nabokov (1993-2009)
 "Perfume" - based on the novel by Patrick Suskind (1995-2006)
 "The Gates of Paradise" - based on the story of the same name by Jerzy Andrzejewski (1998-2003)
 "Ukrainian Hunt" - based on the works of Ostap Vyshnya (1999-2002)
 "Mollis" - based on the novel by Fyodor Dostoevsky "The Meek" (2002-2013)
 "Sin" - based on the works of Mikhail Kotsiubinsky, modern version (2004)
 "Mutation" - based on the works of Fyodor Dostoevsky, modern version (2007-2015)
 "Taboo" - based on the story "Kreutzer Sonata" by Leo Tolstoy, modern version (2009)
 "The sun in your eyes ..." - musical performance-contact (2010)
 "Unrecognized" - based on the novel "Letter from a Stranger" by Stefan Zweig, modern version (2013)
 "Wild" - based on the story "Amok" by Stefan Zweig (2017)

Honours and Awards 

 Honored Artist of Ukraine (1994),
 People's Artist of Ukraine (2005),
 Winner of the Taras Shevchenko National Prize of Ukraine (2007).

Theater Awards 
1989

 Laureate of the 1st prize and the Republican competition of readers named after Taras Shevchenko
 Diploma winner of the All-Ukrainian Theater Festival "Golden Lion"
 Winner of the festival "Theatrical Prydniprovye-89" for the creation of a solo performance "Gaidamaki" based on the poem by T. G. Shevchenko

1990

 At the festival "Theatrical Pridneprovye-90" Melnyk's acting work in the play "The Lost" based on the works of Ostap Vyshnya was noted

1991

 Winner of the festival "Theatrical Dnieper-91" for the creation of the play "Kara" based on the story of Nikolai Gogol "Taras Bulba"

1994

 Laureate of the 1st prize of the theater festival for the highest theater award of the Dnieper region "Sicheslavna-1994" for his artistic contribution to the development of modern national art and the original interpretation of Vladimir Nabokov's novel "Lolita"

1996

 Laureate of the Les Kurbas Prize of the Ministry of Culture of Ukraine for a significant contribution to the development of national art, the search for new theatrical forms
 Laureate and owner of the Grand Prix of the theater festival-competition "Sicheslavna-1996" for selfless service to art in the name of the highest moral ideals reflected in the play "Perfumer" based on the novel by Patrick Suskind

2000

 He was awarded the Order of St. Vladimir III degree of the Ukrainian Orthodox Church of the Kiev Patriarchate for preaching the humanistic ideals of goodness and peace, for selfless service to people and the stage embodiment of Jerzy Andrzeevsky's story "The Gates of Paradise" for the first time in the history of theatrical art

2002

 Laureate of the theater festival-competition "Sicheslavna-2002" in the nomination "Best Actor" for the one-man show "Mollis" based on the story of Fyodor Dostoevsky's "Krotkaya"

2004

 Laureate of the theater festival-competition "Sicheslavna-2004" in the nomination "Best director's work" for the play "Sin" based on the works of Mikhail Kotsiubinsky

2005

 "Silver Knight" at the III International Theater Forum "Golden Knight" (Minsk, Belarus) for the play "Sin"

2006

 Laureate and owner of the Golden Diploma of the IV International Theater Forum "Golden Knight" (Moscow, Russia) for the play "Mollis"

2010

 Awarded with a commemorative medal of the Dnipropetrovsk Regional State Administration "For a significant contribution to the development of the Dnipropetrovsk region"

2012

 Awarded with a commemorative medal of the Dnepropetrovsk city council "For services to the city of Dnepropetrovsk"

References

Literature 

 Irina Solodchenko. "Scream" of the confession of one actor // Kiev Telegraph. - 2007. - April 6–12.
 Elena Nepokora. Actor M. Melnik: “Everything that is built on shocking is a one-day thing and cannot live long” // From-UA. News. - 2009. - December 30.
 Olga Boglevskaya. Mikhail Melnik: “I can't play a hungry person when I'm full. We must do everything honestly " // 2000. - 2013. - February 1 (No. 5 (640)).
 Olga Fomenko. Dnepropetrovsk "Scream", which has been heard for 25 years // Newspaper "Citizen". - 2015. - January 11.

External links 

 Официальный сайт театра «Крик»
 https://instagram.com/krik_theatre
 https://facebook.com/theater.krik

Ukrainian theatre directors
Ukrainian stage actors
Kyiv National I. K. Karpenko-Kary Theatre, Cinema and Television University alumni
Articles with unsourced statements from February 2018
Recipients of the Shevchenko National Prize
Recipients of the title of Merited Artist of Ukraine
Recipients of the title of People's Artists of Ukraine
Living people
1957 births